Zeboudja District is a district of Chlef Province, Algeria.

Communes 
The district is further divided into 3 communes:

 Zeboudja 
 Bénairia 
 Bouzeghaia

References

Districts of Chlef Province